European Leagues (EL) is a sports organisation within association football created for growth of professional football in Europe.

Its members are the professional football leagues organisations of 29 countries: Austria, Belgium, Bulgaria, Denmark, England, Finland, France, Germany, Greece, Israel, Italy, Kazakhstan, the Netherlands, Norway, Poland, Portugal, Russia, Scotland, Slovenia, Spain, Sweden, Switzerland, Romania, Latvia, Ukraine, and Serbia. In addition, there are seven associate leagues representing some of these countries as well as Turkey.

History 
Created in 1997, originally under the name Association of the European Union Premier Professional Football Leagues (EUPPFL). The name was changed from European Professional Football Leagues (EPFL) to European Leagues in April 2018.

Members 
Members of EPFL in 2015:

Regular

Associate

Development

Former 
Former EPFL members:

  Bulgarian Professional Football League (2007–2012, withdrew)
  Association of 1. SNL (2006–2012, changed object action)
  Professional Football League of Ukraine (1997–2008, replaced)

See also 
European Club Association
UEFA
ULEB

Notes

References

External links 
 

Association football organizations